Akkineni Nagarjuna Rao (born 29 August 1959), known mononymously as Nagarjuna, is an Indian actor, film producer, television presenter, and entrepreneur. Nagarjuna has acted predominantly in Telugu cinema, along with a few Hindi and Tamil language films. He has received nine state Nandi Awards, three Filmfare Awards South and two National Film Awards namely, for Ninne Pelladata (1996), which he produced won the Best Feature Film in Telugu and a Special Mention as actor for Annamayya (1997).

In 1989, he starred in the Mani Ratnam-directed romantic drama film Geetanjali, which won the National Film Award for Best Popular Film Providing Wholesome Entertainment. In the same year, he appeared in the blockbuster Siva, an action film directed by Ram Gopal Varma; featured at the 13th IFFI' 90. Nagarjuna made his Bollywood debut with the 1990 Hindi remake of  Shiva. Known by his works in biographical films, he played 15th-century composer Annamacharya in Annamayya (1997), Yavakri (the son of the ascetic Bharadvaja) in Agni Varsha (2002), Major Padmapani Acharya in the war film LOC: Kargil (2003), 17th-century composer Kancherla Gopanna in Sri Ramadasu (2006), Suddala Hanmanthu in Rajanna (2011), Sai Baba of Shirdi in Shirdi Sai (2012), Chandaludu in Jagadguru Adi Shankara (2013), and Hathiram Bhavaji in Om Namo Venkatesaya (2017).

Nagarjuna has largely starred in action films, establishing himself as an action star with works such as Aakhari Poratam (1988), Siva (1989), Chaitanya (1991), Nirnayam (1991), Antham (1992), Killer (1992), Rakshana (1993), Hello Brother (1994), Govinda Govinda (1994), Criminal (1994), Ratchagan (1997), Azad (2000), Sivamani (2003), Mass (2004), Super (2005), Don (2007), Gaganam (2011), Wild Dog (2021), and The Ghost (2022).

In 2013, he represented the Cinema of South India at the Delhi Film Festival's 100 Years of Indian Cinema's celebration, alongside Ramesh Sippy and Vishal Bhardwaj from Bollywood. In 1995, he ventured into film production, with a production unit operating in Seychelles, and was a co-director of an Emmy Award-winning film animation company called Heart Animation. Nagarjuna is the co-owner of the production company Annapurna Studios. He is also the president of the non-profit film school Annapurna International School of Film and Media based in Hyderabad.

Early life and family 
Akkineni Nagarjuna was born on 29 August 1959 in Madras (present-day Chennai) in a Telugu family to the veteran actor Akkineni Nageswara Rao and his wife Annapurna. His family hails from Ramapuram in Krishna District of Andhra Pradesh. His father moved to Madras seeking career as an actor.

The family later moved to Hyderabad, where he did his schooling in Hyderabad Public School and intermediate education from Little Flower Junior College, Hyderabad. He completed one year of his Mechanical Engineering from the College of Engineering, Guindy, Anna University in Madras, former Indian cricketer Krishnamachari Srikanth was his college mate during his Engineering days, and earned his BS in Mechanical Engineering from Eastern Michigan University in Ypsilanti, Michigan.

In February 1984, he married Lakshmi Daggubati, the daughter of D. Ramanaidu, a prominent film-maker, and sister of the actor Venkatesh and producer Suresh Babu. Lakshmi and Nagarjuna have one son, actor Naga Chaitanya born on 23 November 1986. However, the couple got divorced in 1990. Nagarjuna then married actress Amala on 11 June 1992, and the couple have one son, actor Akhil, born on 8 April 1994.

Career 

Nagarjuna began acting as a child artist in the 1967 Telugu film Sudigundalu directed by Adurthi Subba Rao. He appeared as an infant in movie Velugu Needalu penned by Sri Sri. Both movies starred his father Akkineni Nageswara Rao in the lead role. Years later he made his debut as a lead actor through the 1986 Telugu film Vikram, directed by V. Madhusudhana Rao, with Shobana as the female lead. It is the remake of the 1983 Hindi film Hero. The film was a success, giving Nagarjuna a good start. Later, he starred in films like Majnu, directed by Dasari Narayana Rao, which was well received. Nagarjuna got positive reviews for his portrayal of a heartbroken man. He then starred in Sankeertana, a below average grosser directed by debutant Geetha Krishna with music by Ilaiyaraaja. The film was appreciated for its content and music.

In 1988, he starred in the blockbuster Aakhari Poratam, scripted by Yandamuri Veerendranath, and directed by K. Raghavendra Rao where he was paired opposite Sridevi and Suhasini. In 1988 he starred in Janaki Ramudu alongside Vijayashanti. This film, directed again by Raghavendra Rao, was also a hit. In 1989, he starred in the Mani Ratnam-directed romantic drama Geetanjali. The film won the National Film Award for Best Popular Film Providing Wholesome Entertainment in 1990. Immediately, he saw another success, Siva. This film marked the debut of director Ram Gopal Varma. This film is considered a trendsetter in Telugu cinema, and made Nagarjuna a superstar. In 1990, he subsequently made his Bollywood debut with the Hindi remake of the same film titled Shiva. Even the Hindi version saw huge box-office success. He then starred in Jaitra Yatra, for which he received critical acclaim. He followed it up with sub fare like Prema Yuddham and Iddaru Iddare.  Nirnayam where he acted again with Amala however was a hit.

He followed it up with box office hits like Killer, Neti Siddhartha, and Nirnayam, working with eminent directors such as Fazil, and Priyadarshan. Nagarjuna was fondly called "Celluloid Scientist" for his nature of experimenting with different scripts. Some of his prominent hit films released subsequently included President Gari Pellam, Varasudu, Gharana Bullodu and Allari Alludu. In 1994, he starred in his first Hindi-Telugu bilingual Criminal directed by Mahesh Bhatt. In the same year he ventured into comedy for the first time with Hello Brother which was a huge hit, and was later remade into Hindi as Judwaa. Many of his films were also dubbed into Tamil.  In 1996, Nagarjuna starred in and produced Ninne Pelladata, directed by Krishna Vamsi. The movie won the National Film Award for Best Feature Film in Telugu and Filmfare Award for Best Film – Telugu. The next year, Nagarjuna acted in Annamayya, in which he portrayed the role of Annamacharya, a 15th-century Telugu singer and poet. This won him his Filmfare Best Actor Award and his first Nandi Award for Best Actor. He also received a National Award for this role. Later that year, he starred in the Tamil film Ratchagan, directed by Praveen Gandhi. The film was a success at the Tamil Nadu box office. His subsequent releases were Nuvvu Vastavani, Ninne Premistha and Azad.

He starred in romantic comedies such as Santosham, Manmadhudu, and Sivamani. He produced Satyam in 2003, which starred his nephew Sumanth. In 2004, Nagarjuna had two releases, Nenunnanu and Mass. The latter was produced by Nagarjuna and directed by choreographer Lawrence Raghavendra. In 2005, Nagarjuna acted in and produced Super. In 2006, he starred in Sri Ramadasu, his second period film based on the 18th-century Telugu Saint/poet of the same name. Nagarjuna received the Nandi Award for Best Actor for this film. In December 2007, he appeared in Don and a year later, he appeared in King alongside Trisha and Srihari.

In 2010, he had the films Kedi and Ragada. Gaganam was released on 11 February 2011. Its Tamil version was titled Payanam. In 2011 Nagarjuna signed three movies in a row: Rajanna, Damarukam and Shirdi Sai. His next film  Greeku Veerudu alongside Nayanthara, was a sub par grosser. His next Bhai was a disaster at the box office. In 2014, Nagarjuna starred in the blockbuster family drama, Manam, directed by Vikram Kumar. He had a dual role in Soggade Chinni Nayana, which turned out to be one of his biggest blockbusters. Later he played a cripple in Vamshi Paidipally's bilingual film Oopiri, which was a hit. In 2017, he played a devotional role in the film Om Namo Venkatesaya. It garnered average reviews from critics and turned out to be a disaster. He then starred in a horror film titled Raju Gari Gadhi 2, which had an average run at the box office. In 2018, he starred in the film Officer directed and produced by Ram Gopal Varma. It got poor reviews from critics and went on to become the biggest disaster in Nagarjuna's career. On 27 September 2018, Devadas, directed by Sriram Aditya, featuring Nagarjuna alongside Nani. This film co starred Rashmika Mandanna and Aakanksha Singh and turned out to be a moderate success.

Off-screen and other works

Television 

Nagarjuna made his début as a television producer in 2009 with the soap opera Yuva. He was a major shareholders of the television channel Maa TV before it was sold to the Star Network. Nagarjuna hosted the Indian Telugu-language version of Who Wants to Be a Millionaire? titled Meelo Evaru Koteeswarudu. The first season of the show was telecast on MAA TV from 9 June 2014 to 7 August 2014 (40 episodes). The second season was also showcased on MAA TV from 9 December 2014 to 27 February 2015 (55 episodes). In 2015, he was honored with the Entertainment Leader Award (Television) for his work in the show at the TV5 Business Leaders Awards ceremony. He had hosted the third, fourth, fifth and sixth seasons of Bigg Boss in 2019, 2020, 2021 and 2022.

Ownerships, endorsements and earnings 

Since 2013, He was a co-owner of the Mumbai Masters of the Indian Badminton League, along with Sunil Gavaskar, and the Mahi Racing Team India, along with MS Dhoni. Nagarjuna currently endorses Kalyan Jewellers in Telangana and Andhra Pradesh. He was listed No. 36 and No. 43 in Forbes Indias top 100 Celebrities for the years 2012 and 2013 respectively. He is one of the co-owners of the Indian Super League club Kerala Blasters FC.

N3 Realty Enterprises 
Nagarjuna is the founding partner of N3 Realty Enterprises, the parent entity for N-Convention center, N-Grill and District N. The later two establishments are now non-existent. In 2014, the Greater Hyderabad Municipal Corporation identified that N convention had encroached on litigated premises. Subsequently, through legal opinions, a correction path of the land was initiated by the local administrators.

Charity 
Nagarjuna, along with his wife Amala, are co-founders of Blue Cross of Hyderabad, recognised by the Animal Welfare Board of India. It is a non-government organisation (NGO) in Hyderabad, which works for the welfare of animals. Nagarjuna was also involved in welfare programs undertaken by the MAA TV association, and presently serves as the brand ambassador for HIV/AIDS awareness campaigns. In 2010, he starred in an HIV/AIDS animated software tutorial created by TeachAids, a nonprofit founded at Stanford University.

Awards and nominations 

Nagarjuna has been the recipient of two National Film Awards, nine Nandi Awards and three Filmfare Awards South.

References

External links 

 
 Nagarjuna at Bollywood Hungama

1959 births
Living people
Indian male film actors
Telugu film producers
Telugu male actors
Male actors in Hindi cinema
Male actors from Hyderabad, India
Male actors from Chennai
Male actors in Tamil cinema
Eastern Michigan University alumni
Businesspeople from Andhra Pradesh
Indian game show hosts
Businesspeople from Hyderabad, India
Filmfare Awards South winners
Nandi Award winners
College of Engineering, Guindy alumni
Special Mention (feature film) National Film Award winners
CineMAA Awards winners
Kerala Blasters FC owners
21st-century Indian actors
Indian Hindus